Somerset Maugham TV Theatre (originally known as Teller of Tales for the first three episodes) is an American anthology drama program. The series aired on CBS October 18, 1950 – March 28, 1951, and on NBC April 2, 1951 – December 10, 1951, airing 47 episodes.

Premise

The series made its debut on October 18, 1950 on CBS. The series was a half-hour (later 60 minute) drama whose episodes were based on the works and novels of the show's namesake William Somerset Maugham.

Maugham made special appearances at the beginning and ending of each play always giving the introduction and conclusion to each episode. His segments were filmed, while the dramas themselves were presented live.

Season 2 Changes

Move to NBC

After the series finished its run on CBS after one season on March 28, 1951, the series was moved to NBC on April 2, 1951. The series would remain for the rest of its run. The series also moved from Wednesday nights to Monday nights and expanded to 60 minutes, alternating weekly with Robert Montgomery Presents.

Season two finished its second season on September 3 after airing 16 episodes.

Season 3

The series started its third season on September 17, 1951, continuing to air on Monday nights and for sixty minutes. This season would be the show's final season airing its last episode on December 10, 1951, after airing 7 episodes.

Production notes

The series was directed by directors Martin Ritt and David Alexander and produced by John Gibbs, Ann Marlow, and Daniel Petrie.

Also, the introductions and epilogues given by Maugham were filmed live from his home in the French Riviera and the plays broadcast live from New York City.

During its third season, the show alternated on Monday nights with the successful NBC anthology series Robert Montgomery Presents.

Broadcast history

Wednesdays 9–9:30 PM, October 18, 1950 – March 28, 1951, on CBS.
Mondays 9:30–10:30 PM, April 2, 1951 – June 25, 1951, on NBC.
Mondays 9:30–10 PM, July 9, 1951 – August 27, 1951, on NBC.
Mondays 9:30–10:30 PM, September 3, 1951 – December 10, 1951, on NBC.

Cast
Actors appearing in the series included:

Luther Adler
Judith Anderson
Joan Bennett
Lee J. Cobb
Dane Clark
Robert Cummings
Mildred Dunnock
Nina Foch
Bonita Granville
June Havoc
Grace Kelly
Otto Kruger
Veronica Lake
Cloris Leachman
Murray Matheson
Peggy McCay
Mildred Natwick
Anthony Quinn
Joseph Schildkraut
Martha Scott
Beatrice Straight
Jessica Tandy

Episodes

Season 1

The Creative Impulse – October 18, 1950
McKintosh – October 25, 1950
Winter Cruise – November 1, 1950
Episode – November 15, 1950
"The Unconquered" – November 19, 1950, Rex Williams, Olive Deering
"Lord Mountdrago" – November 22, 1950, Arnold Moss
The String of Beads – November 29, 1950
Force of Circumstance – December 6, 1950
The Round Dozen – December 13, 1950
Footprints in the Jungle – December 20, 1950
Virtue – December 27, 1950
The Treasure – January 3, 1951
The Man from Glasgow – January 10, 1951
The Vessel of Wrath – January 17, 1951
Honolulu – January 24, 1951
Partners – January 31, 1951
The Romantic Young Lady – February 7, 1951
The Dream – February 14, 1951
The People You Meet – February 21, 1951
The Outstation – February 28, 1951
The Back of Beyond – March 7, 1951
Halfway to Broadway – March 14, 1951
The Luncheon – March 21, 1951
End of Flight – March 28, 1951

Season 2

Of Human Bondage – April 2, 1951
Theatre – April 16, 1951
The Moon and Sixpence – April 30, 1951
The Facts of Life – May 14, 1951
Cakes and Ale – May 28, 1951
The Narrow Corner – June 11, 1951
The Letter – June 25, 1951
The French Governor – July 9, 1951
The Promise – July 16, 1951
In Hiding – July 23, 1951
The Ardent Bigamist – July 30, 1951
Bewitched – August 6, 1951
The Great Man – August 13, 1951
The Yellow Streak – August 20, 1951
A Woman of Fifty – August 27, 1951
Appearances in Reality – September 3, 1951

Season 3

The Mother – September 17, 1951
Grace – October 1, 1951
Masquerade – October 15, 1951
The Fall of Edward Bernard – October 29, 1951
Before the Party – November 12, 1951
Home and Beauty – November 26, 1951
"Smith Serves" – December 10, 1951, starring Eddie Albert

References

External links

Somerset Maugham TV Theatre at CVTA with episode list

1950s American anthology television series
1950 American television series debuts
1951 American television series endings
Black-and-white American television shows
CBS original programming
NBC original programming
Adaptations of works by W. Somerset Maugham
Television shows filmed in France